Emirto de Lima (25 January 1890 – 14 August 1972) was a Colombian composer. His work was part of the music event in the art competition at the 1932 Summer Olympics.

References

1890 births
1972 deaths
Colombian composers
Olympic competitors in art competitions